Stylissa is a genus of sponges in the family Scopalinidae.

Species
 Stylissa acanthelloides Lévi, 1961
 Stylissa caribica Lehnert & van Soest, 1998
 Stylissa carteri Dendy, 1889
 Stylissa constricta Pulitzer-Finali, 1982
 Stylissa conulosa Dendy, 1922
 Stylissa flabelliformis Hentschel, 1912
 Stylissa flexibilis Lévi, 1961
 Stylissa haurakii Brøndsted, 1924
 Stylissa inflexa Pulitzer-Finali, 1982
 Stylissa letra Dickinson, 1945
 Stylissa massa Carter, 1887
 Stylissa vernonensis Hooper, Cook, Hobbs & Kennedy, 1997

References

Halichondrida